The 1939–40 season was the 65th season of competitive football in England. It was suspended in September after the outbreak of World War II.

Overview
World War II broke out early into this season. Shortly after war was declared, most competitions, including the Football League, were abandoned as the country's attention turned to the war effort. A few leagues, such as the Northern League, did manage to complete a season, but more than half of the teams were unable to fulfil all their fixtures and resigned.

Blackpool sat at the top of the First Division table at the time the abandonment occurred.
The FA Cup Extra-Preliminary Round was played, but with hostilities declared before replays took place, that competition too was abandoned. Entry fees received for the 1939–40 Cup were honoured for the next Cup in 1945–46.

Many footballers signed up to fight in the war and as a result many teams were depleted, and fielded guest players instead. Regional league competitions were set up. Appearances in these tournaments do not count in players' official records. The FA Cup was resumed for the 1945–46 season and The Football League for the 1946–47 season.

Honours

Wartime

After the abandonment of the football programme, the league was split into ten mini regional leagues. A national cup competition was also held.

League tables

North West League

North East League

West League

East Midland League

Midland League

South West League

South A League

South B League

South C League

South D League

See also
England national football team results (unofficial matches)

References
 

 
Wartime seasons in English football